The year 2000 in science and technology involved some significant events.

Astronomy and space exploration

 May 4 – A rare astronomical conjunction occurs on the new moon including all seven of the traditional celestial bodies known from ancient times until the discovery of Uranus in 1781; this conjunction consists of the Sun and Moon, Mercury, Venus, Mars, Jupiter and Saturn.
 August 10 – Publication of the M–sigma relation in The Astrophysical Journal.

Biology
 June 26 – 'Rough draft' of the human genome is announced jointly by President of the United States Bill Clinton and British Prime Minister Tony Blair.
 December 14 – The full genome sequence of the flowering plant Arabidopsis thaliana is published in Nature.
 10-year Census of Marine Life launched.

Computer science
January 1 – Year 2000 problem proves to be of little global significance.
March 4 – Sony Computer Entertainment releases the PlayStation 2 sixth generation home video game console in Japan.
March 14 – Stephen King's horror story Riding the Bullet is published in e-book format only, the world's first mass-market electronic book.
September – First system enabling the selection, automatic downloading and storage of serial episodic audio content on PCs and portable devices, origin of the podcast, is launched by early MP3 player manufacturer i2Go.

Earth sciences
March – Iceberg B-15, with a surface area of 11,000 km2 (4,200 sq mi), calves from the Ross Ice Shelf of Antarctica.
April – Cave of the Crystals discovered at the Naica Mine in Mexico.

Mathematics
Omer Reingold, Salil Vadhan and Avi Wigderson introduce the zig-zag product.

Medicine
January – Douglas Hanahan and Robert Weinberg publish "The Hallmarks of Cancer".
January 31 – English doctor Harold Shipman is found guilty of killing fifteen of his elderly patients by lethal injections of diamorphine, the only British physician ever convicted of murdering his patients; he is actually considered to have killed at least 215.

Paleontology
First fossil of Orrorin, an early species of Homininae, discovered in the Tugen Hills of Kenya.

Philosophy

Awards
 Nobel Prizes
 Physics – Zhores Alferov, Herbert Kroemer - Jack Kilby
 Chemistry – Alan J Heeger, Alan G MacDiarmid, Hideki Shirakawa
 Medicine – Arvid Carlsson, Paul Greengard, Eric R. Kandel
 Turing Award: Andrew Yao
 Wollaston Medal for Geology: William Sefton Fyfe

Deaths
 January 12 – Margaret Hutchinson Rousseau (b. 1910), American chemical engineer
 January 19 – G. Ledyard Stebbins (b. 1906), American botanist and geneticist
 March 7 – W. D. Hamilton (b. 1936), English evolutionary biologist, widely recognised as one of the greatest evolutionary theorists of the 20th century
 March 10 – Nim Chimpsky (b. 1973), chimpanzee
 May 6 – John Clive Ward (b. 1924), English-born physicist
 May 19 – Yevgeny Khrunov (b. 1933), cosmonaut
 June 14 – Elsie Widdowson (b. 1908), English nutritionist
 July 8 – W. David Kingery (b. 1926), American materials scientist specializing in ceramic materials
 July 14 – Sir Mark Oliphant (b. 1901), Australian nuclear physicist
 July 29 – René Favaloro (b. 1923), Argentine cardiac surgeon
 September 20 – Gherman Titov (b. 1935), cosmonaut
 October 4 – Michael Smith (b. 1932), English-born Canadian chemist, 1993 Nobel Prize winner
 November 20  – Nikolay Dollezhal (b. 1899), a key figure in Soviet atomic bomb project and chief designer of nuclear reactors

References

 
20th century in science
2000s in science